Alonso Godina (died 28 February 1630) was a Roman Catholic prelate who served as Auxiliary Bishop of Seville (1629–1630).

Biography
On 20 August 1629, he was selected by the King of Spain and confirmed by Pope Urban VIII as Auxiliary Bishop of Seville and Titular Bishop of Utica. In 1629, he was consecrated bishop by Diego Guzmán de Haros, Archbishop of Seville. He served as Auxiliary Bishop of Seville until his death on 28 February 1630. While bishop, he was the principal co-consecrator of Luis Córdoba Ronquillo, Bishop of Cartagena (1631).

References

External links and additional sources
 (for Chronology of Bishops) 
 (for Chronology of Bishops) 

1630 deaths
17th-century Roman Catholic bishops in Spain
Bishops appointed by Pope Urban VIII